The 1961 Summer Universiade, also known as the II Summer Universiade, was an international sporting event for university students that took place in Sofia, Bulgaria.

Sports at the 1961 Summer Universiade
 Athletics
 Basketball
 Diving
 Fencing
 Gymnastics
 Swimming
 Tennis
 Volleyball
 Water polo

Medal table

 
1961
U
U
U
Multi-sport events in Bulgaria
Sports competitions in Sofia
1960s in Sofia
August 1961 sports events in Europe
September 1961 sports events in Europe